Paul Stannard (17 January 1895 – 24 November 1982) was an English professional footballer who played as a forward for Sunderland.

References

1895 births
1982 deaths
People from Warwick
English footballers
Association football forwards
Tamworth F.C. players
Sunderland A.F.C. players
South Shields F.C. (1889) players
Carlisle United F.C. players
Workington A.F.C. players
West Stanley F.C. players
Jarrow F.C. players
English Football League players